Leighton Goldie McCarthy,  (December 15, 1869 – October 3, 1952) was a Canadian lawyer, politician, businessman and diplomat.

Life and career
Born in Walkerton, Ontario, McCarthy was called to the Ontario Bar in 1892. He was elected to the House of Commons of Canada in 1898 as an independent representing the riding of Simcoe North, following the death of the incumbent, his father Dalton McCarthy, in a carriage accident. He was re-elected in 1900 and 1904 but was defeated in 1911, when he ran as a Liberal.

In 1928, McCarthy became president of the Canada Life Assurance Company. In 1941, he was appointed to the Queen's Privy Council for Canada.

From 1941 to 1944, McCarthy served as Canada's top diplomatic representative in Washington, D.C., and he became the first Canadian ambassador to the United States (previously, the position was called Envoy Extraordinary and Minister Plenipotentiary). McCarthy was a lawyer before and after his political and diplomatic appointment but ended his practice in 1946.

McCarthy moved to Toronto and built a house at 45 Walmer Road in 1932, and he died here in 1952. McCarthy bequeathed his home to the University of Toronto. Since 1953, the building has housed the university's Institute of Child Study.

Archives
There is a Leighton G. McCarthy and family fonds at Library and Archives Canada. Archival reference number is R4172.

References

External links
 

1869 births
1952 deaths
Ambassadors of Canada to the United States
Independent MPs in the Canadian House of Commons
Members of the King's Privy Council for Canada
Members of the House of Commons of Canada from Ontario
People from Bruce County
Canadian lawyers
Canadian Protestants